Erivélton Aragão or simply Erivélton  (born July 28, 1983 in Curitiba), is a Brazilian right back. He currently plays for Atlético-PR.

Contract
12 March 2008 to 12 June 2008

References

External links
 CBF
 furacao

1983 births
Living people
Brazilian footballers
Paraná Clube players
Associação Atlética Iguaçu players
Club Athletico Paranaense players
Association football defenders
Footballers from Curitiba